Goldhawk Road is a London Underground station located in the London Borough of Hammersmith and Fulham, on the south side of Goldhawk Road, about  west of Shepherd's Bush Green. It is served by the Circle and Hammersmith & City lines in Travelcard Zone 2.

Although the line here was opened on 13 June 1864, a station was not opened at this location until 1 April 1914 when Shepherd's Bush station (now Shepherd's Bush Market) was moved from its original location between Uxbridge Road and Goldhawk Road to a location on the north side of Uxbridge Road.

Station amenities

The station currently benefits from a ticket office and two Passenger Operated Machines (or POM's). The larger POM, called a Multi Fare Machine (MFM) accepts UK Sterling notes, up to the value of £20 and gives change consisting of 10p, 50p, £1 and £2 coins. The smaller machine known as an Advance Fare Machine (AFM) does not give change and accepts overpayment up to 30p. Both machines accept most major Credit and Debit cards, however to help combat fraud, individual cards can only be used once a day. These machines are the standard London Underground installation at all LU operated stations.

The station also benefits from the use of Electric Service Update Boards or ESUBS. These large screen advertise service information which is updated from the Network Operations Centre, located at London Underground's head office above St James Park Tube station.

Connections
London Buses routes 94 and 237 serve the station.

Local amenities
There is one business operating on the station premises , a speciality coffee house.

Directly across Goldhawk Road is the south entrance to Shepherd's Bush Market. A traditional pie and mash shop operates almost opposite the station on the other side of the Goldhawk Road, as do various other eating and drinking establishments.

The station is a short walk to and from Queens Park Rangers football club on Loftus Road.

The historic music venue currently known as the O2 Shepherd's Bush Empire is a short walk from the station, originally opened in 1903 for impresario Oswald Stoll, designed by theatre architect Frank Matcham.

References

External links

 
 
 
 

Circle line (London Underground) stations
Hammersmith & City line stations
Tube stations in the London Borough of Hammersmith and Fulham
Former Hammersmith and City Railway stations
Railway stations in Great Britain opened in 1914
Shepherd's Bush